Jezioro Białe  means 'white lake' in Polish.

Jezioro Białe may refer to:
 Jezioro Białe, Lublin Voivodeship, a lake in Lublin Voivodeship
 Jezioro Białe, Lubusz Voivodship, a lake in Lubusz Voivodship, Międzyrzecz County
 Jezioro Białe, Gostynin County, a lake in Masovian Voivodeship, in Gostynin County
 Jezioro Białe, Sokołów County, a lake in Masovian Voivodeship, Sokołów County
 Jezioro Białe, Gmina Rutka-Tartak, a lake in Podlaskie Voivodeship, Suwałki County
 Jezioro Białe, Gmina Suwałki, a lake in Podlaskie Voivodeship, in Suwałki County
 Jezioro Białe, Gmina Wiżajny, a lake in Podlaskie Voivodeship, in Suwałki County
 Jezioro Białe, Ełk County, a lake in Warmian-Masurian Voivodeship, in Ełk County
 Jezioro Białe, Biała Giżycka, a lake in Warmian-Masurian Voivodeship, in Giżycko County
 Jezioro Białe, Wydmin, a lake in Warmian-Masurian Voivodeship, in Giżycko County
 Jezioro Białe, Mrągowo County, a lake in Warmian-Masurian Voivodeship, in  Mrągowo County
 Jezioro Białe, Szczytno County, a lake in Warmian-Masurian Voivodeship, in Szczytno County
 Jezioro Białe, West Pomeranian Voivodship, a lake in West Pomeranian Voivodship, in  Myślibórz County
 Jezioro Białe Augustowskie in Augustów
 Jezioro Białe Filipowskie
 Jezioro Białe Miałkie
 Jezioro Białe Sejneńskie
 Jezioro Białe Sosnowickie
 Jezioro Białe Wigierskie

See also 
 Białe Jezioro (disambiguation)